Danielle Catanzariti (born 16 February 1992) is an Australian actress and stage actress. She is best known for her role as the title character in the 2008 film Hey, Hey, It's Esther Blueburger.

Career

Hey, Hey, It's Esther Blueburger
In mid-2006, Catanzariti was chosen from over 3,000 Australian girls to portray the title role in the feature Hey, Hey, It's Esther Blueburger. The film also stars Australian-born New Zealand actress Keisha Castle-Hughes who was the main character in Whale Rider. Catanzariti is also the lead singer for Sometimes, who feature in the film.

Stage
In 2007, she had a supporting role in Closed for Winter, and was a principal cast member of the Sydney Theatre Company's production of David Harrower's Blackbird with Cate Blanchett as director. She also stars in the Windmill Theatre's production of "Girl Who Cried Wolf" Showing from 14 to 24 June 2011. Recently Catanzariti was in the State Theatre performance 'Baby Teeth' playing the lead.

Personal life
Catanzariti grew up in Murray Bridge, South Australia. She completed her high school education at St Francis de Sales College in Mount Barker.

Filmography

References

External links

Esther Blueburger Trailer Fan website
Danielle Catanzariti chats abouts Esther Blueburger, acting, being a teenager & more

1992 births
Australian child actresses
Australian film actresses
Living people
People from Murray Bridge, South Australia